{{DISPLAYTITLE:C18H23NO6}}
The molecular formula C18H23NO6 (molar mass: 349.38 g/mol, exact mass: 349.1525 u) may refer to:

 Iprocrolol
 Methylvanillylecgonine
 Riddelliine
 Tazopsine